Kinetic Content is an American television production company launched in 2010 that creates and produces content on a global scale. Led by founder and CEO Chris Coelen, Kinetic has been part of Peter Chernin's The North Road Company, since June 2022.

Kinetic series include the global Netflix phenomenons Love Is Blind The Ultimatum and Perfect Match; the highly-rated Married at First Sight, which ranks as Lifetime's number one series; Claim to Fame for ABC/Hulu and Love Without Borders for Bravo. Kinetic's upcoming slate features projects for numerous networks including Netflix, Amazon, Peacock, ABC/Hulu, Bravo, and HBO Max.

Programming
Kinetic Content primarily produces non-scripted content, but recently announced its new endeavor into the scripted sect in 2020. Kinetic is known for its TV franchises and spin-offs, including Married at First Sight, Love is Blind, and the Little Women franchise.

Awards and nominations

|-
! scope="row"| 2019
| Married at First Sight
| Critics' Choice Award for Best Relationship Show
| 
|-
! scope="row"| 2020
| Love is Blind
| Critics' Choice Award for Best Relationship Show
| 
|-
! scope="row"| 2020
| Love is Blind
| Grierson Award for Best Entertaining Documentary
| 
|-
! scope="row"| 2020
| Love is Blind
| Emmy for Outstanding Structured Reality Program
| 
|-
! scope="row"| 2020
| Love is Blind
| Emmy for Outstanding Casting for a Reality Program
| 
|-
! scope="row"| 2022
| The Ultimatum
| Critics' Choice Award for Best Relationship Show
| 
|-
! scope="row"| 2022
| Love is Blind
| Critics' Choice Award for Best Relationship Show
| 
|-
! scope="row"| 2022
| Love is Blind
| Emmy for Outstanding Structured Reality Program
|

Shows

References

Film production companies of the United States
Television production companies of the United States
American companies established in 2010
Entertainment companies based in California
Companies based in Los Angeles
Entertainment companies established in 2010
2010 establishments in California